Espino Airport  was an airstrip  southeast of San Isidro del Espino (:de:San Isidro del Espino), a village in the Santa Cruz Department of Bolivia.

Google Maps, HERE Maps, and Bing Maps all show the remains of a grass airstrip overgrown with brush and trees.

See also
Transport in Bolivia
List of airports in Bolivia

References 

Defunct airports
Airports in Santa Cruz Department (Bolivia)